The Florida Complex League (FCL) is a rookie-level Minor League Baseball league that operates in Florida, United States. Before 2021, it was known as the Gulf Coast League (GCL). Together with the Arizona Complex League (ACL), it forms the lowest rung on the North American minor-league ladder.

FCL teams play at the minor league spring training complexes of their parent Major League Baseball (MLB) clubs and are owned by those parent clubs. Admission is not charged, and no concessions are operated at the teams' games. Every Grapefruit League team fields at least one team in the league. Night games are commonly played in the spring training stadium, although games may also be played at the team's practice fields.

As of the 2021 season, there is no league limit to how many players can be on an active roster, but no team can have more than three players with four or more years of minor-league experience. Major-league players on rehabilitation assignments may also appear in the league.

History 
Complex-based baseball leagues, which played before sparse crowds and often scheduled morning games to avoid the summer heat and afternoon thunderstorms, were adopted after the drastic shrinking of minor league baseball during the 1950s and 1960s. MLB teams needed an entry level to professional baseball for 18- and 19-year-old players graduating from high schools or signed from Latin America. They are considered the lowest rung on the minor league ladder.

The current league was founded in 1964 as the Sarasota Rookie League (SRL) with four teams playing in Sarasota. It was originally intended to be the Gulf Coast division of a statewide rookie league, with the eastern division Cocoa Rookie League based in Cocoa. However, the eastern and western teams never played each other. The SRL's four teams consisted of squads sponsored by the Chicago White Sox, Milwaukee Braves, New York Yankees, and St. Louis Cardinals. The SRL Braves, managed by Paul Snyder, future Atlanta farm system director, won the championship with a 36–23 record.

 SRL Braves
 SRL Cardinals
 SRL White Sox
 SRL Yankees

The league added teams in Bradenton in 1965 and changed its name to the Florida Rookie League.

 FRL Astros
 FRL Braves
 FRL Cardinals
 FRL Twins
 FRL White Sox
 FRL Yankees

Gulf Coast League 
The league adopted Gulf Coast League (GCL) naming for the 1966 season. It expanded to Florida's east coast in the 1990s.

Historically, three separate leagues also used the Gulf Coast League name: a 1907–1908 Class D league, a 1926 Class D league and a 1950–1953 Class C (1950) and Class B League. The 1907 founding members were the Alexandria White Sox, Lafayette Browns, Lake Charles Creoles, Monroe Municipals, Opelousas Indians and Orange Hoo-Hoos. The 1950–1953 version featured the Brownsville Charros, Corpus Christi Aces, Galveston White Caps, Harlingen Capitals, Lake Charles Lakers, Laredo Apaches, Port Arthur Seahawks and Texas City Texans, along with the Crowley Millers, Jacksonville Jax, Lufkin/Leesville Angels in 1950. All three leagues operated around the Gulf coasts of Texas and Louisiana.

On June 21, 2016, the GCL hired Jen Pawol, the first female umpire in Minor League Baseball since 2007, and the first in the GCL since 1978.  In 2017, the GCL hired another woman umpire, Emma Charlesworth-Seiler.

The start of the 2020 season was postponed due to the COVID-19 pandemic before ultimately being canceled on June 30.

Florida Complex League 
Prior to the 2021 season, in continuation of MLB's reorganization of the minor leagues, the two US-based complex leagues were renamed, with the Gulf Coast League becoming the Florida Complex League (FCL).

For 2021, the league consists of 18 teams affiliated with 15 different MLB franchises, as three franchises are fielding two teams each.

League format 

The league plays a 52- to 56-game season that runs from mid-June to late August. As of 2022, four teams—three division winners and one wild card team—qualify for the playoffs seeded by winning percentage regardless of division standing, with seeds 1 vs. 4 and 2 vs. 3 playing in a single-game semi-final. A best-of-three series between the two semi-final winners follows to determine the league champion.

Current teams 
Teams in the league are not referred to by their home city, but simply by their parent club's name. A prefix of FCL (previously GCL) is typically used to differentiate the team from its parent club and other farm teams with the same nickname. For instances when a parent club fields two teams in the league, a suffix is used—typically this is a direction (e.g. East, West) or a color (e.g. Blue, Orange). Some teams share stadiums with their club's Single-A affiliate in the Florida State League. Note that Single-A teams do use city names—for example the Tampa Tarpons, who also use the Yankees' spring training complex.

After the Houston Astros and Kansas City Royals each fielded two teams as late as 1981, no franchise did so until the New York Yankees in 2013. The Yankees were joined by the Detroit Tigers and Philadelphia Phillies in fielding two teams in 2016 and 2018, respectively. As of the 2021 season, the Tigers, Baltimore Orioles, and Pittsburgh Pirates are each fielding two teams.

Past teams 
 Gulf Coast League Athletics (1967–1968)
 Gulf Coast League Cubs (1972–1982, 1993–1996)
 Became the Arizona League Cubs in 1997
 Gulf Coast League Dodgers (1983–1992, 2001–2008)
 Became the Arizona League Dodgers in 2009
 Gulf Coast League Expos (1969–1970; 1974; 1977; 1986–2004)
 Became the Gulf Coast League Nationals in 2005
 Gulf Coast League Indians (1967–1975, 1988–1990, 2006–2008)
 Became the Arizona League Indians in 2009
 Gulf Coast League Padres (1981–1982)
 Gulf Coast League Rangers (1973–2002)
 Became the Arizona League Rangers in 2003
 Gulf Coast League Red Birds (1972–1973)
 Gulf Coast League Reds (1968–1973, 1984–1990, 1999–2009)
 Became the Arizona League Reds in 2010
 Gulf Coast League Royals (1971–1983; 1985–2002)
 Included the GCL Royals Academy (defunct 1974), GCL Royals Blue (1979–1981), and GCL Royals Gold (1979–1981)
 Became the Arizona League Royals in 2003
 Gulf Coast League Tourists (1970)
 Gulf Coast League White Sox (1966–1977, 1980–1997)
 Became the Arizona League White Sox in 1998

League champions: 1964–present 
Numbers in parentheses indicate a franchise's instance of winning the championship, after its first instance.

 1964 – SRL Braves
 1965 – FRL Astros
 1966 – GCL Yankees
 1967 – GCL Athletics
 1968 – GCL Athletics (2)
 1969 – GCL Expos
 1970 – GCL White Sox
 1971 – GCL Royals
 1972 – GCL Cubs
 1973 – GCL Rangers
 1974 – GCL Cubs (2)
 1975 – GCL Rangers (2)
 1976 – GCL Rangers (3)
 1977 – GCL White Sox (2)
 1978 – GCL Rangers (4)
 1979 – GCL Astros (2)
 1980 – GCL Royals Blue
 1981 – GCL Royals Gold
 1982 – GCL Yankees (2)
 1983 – GCL Dodgers
 1984 – GCL Rangers (5)
 1985 – GCL Yankees (3)
 1986 – GCL Dodgers (2)
 1987 – GCL Dodgers (3)
 1988 – GCL Yankees (4)
 1989 – GCL Yankees (5)
 1990 – GCL Dodgers (4)
 1991 – GCL Expos (2)
 1992 – GCL Royals (2)
 1993 – GCL Rangers (6)
 1994 – GCL Astros (3)
 1995 – GCL Royals (3)
 1996 – GCL Yankees (6)
 1997 – GCL Mets
 1998 – GCL Rangers (7)
 1999 – GCL Mets (2)
 2000 – GCL Rangers (8)
 2001 – GCL Yankees (7)
 2002 – GCL Phillies
 2003 – GCL Braves (2)
 2004 – GCL Yankees (8)
 2005 – GCL Yankees (9)
 2006 – GCL Red Sox
 2007 – GCL Yankees (10)
 2008 – GCL Phillies (2)
 2009 – GCL Nationals
 2010 – GCL Phillies (3)
 2011 – GCL Yankees (11)
 2012 – GCL Pirates
 2013 – GCL Nationals (2)
 2014 – GCL Red Sox (2)
 2015 – GCL Red Sox (3)
 2016 – GCL Cardinals
 2017 – GCL Yankees East (12)
 2018 – GLC Tigers West
 2019 – No champion
 2020 – No season
 2021 – FCL Rays
 2022 – FCL Yankees (13)

  2019 playoffs canceled due to Hurricane Dorian
  2020 season canceled due to COVID-19 pandemic

See also 
 List of Florida Complex League team rosters

Sources

Notes

References

External links 

 

 
Minor baseball leagues in the United States
Baseball leagues in Florida
1964 establishments in Florida
Sports leagues established in 1964